Jenny Tinghui Zhang is a Chinese-American writer from Austin, Texas.

Early life and education
Zhang was born in Changchun, China, and grew up in Austin, Texas, and Oxford, Mississippi. She received an MFA from the University of Wyoming. She is an editor for The Adroit Journal, and her writing has appeared in The Rumpus, HuffPost, Catapult, Literary Hub, and The Cut.

Career
Zhang's first novel, Four Treasures of the Sky, was published by Flatiron and Penguin in 2022. It was a New York Times Book Review Editor's Choice, and was reviewed by NPR, The Washington Post, and Publishers Weekly, among others.

Ann Patchett praised Zhang's "considerable talents" in writing an "engulfing, bighearted, and heartbreaking novel." In her New York Times review of Four Treasures of the Sky, Jennifer Egan described Zhang's writing as "engrossing" and "an arresting combination of earthy and lyric."

Zhang has cited C Pam Zhang’s How Much of These Hills Is Gold, Barbara Kingsolver's The Poisonwood Bible, and Alexander Chee's Edinburgh as sources of inspiration for her writing.

In 2022, Zhang told interviewers that she was working on her second novel.

References

Further reading

External links 
 Official website

Year of birth missing (living people)
21st-century American novelists
American writers of Chinese descent
American women novelists
Living people
Chinese emigrants to the United States
University of Wyoming alumni
Novelists from Texas